Chef Adrian Martin (Adrian Martin) born 9 October 1991 is an Irish celebrity chef and author from Cavan. He is also the owner and head chef of Wildflower Restaurant in London.

He is known for his work online with various foodie websites and on TV with RTÉ, TV3 and Virgin Media Television.

Early life 
Starting at the age of 14, he trained in some of Ireland's most renowned restaurants including Mac Nean House and Bon Appetit, Malahide. He also holds a degree in culinary arts from the School of Tourism Killybegs, studied in South West College Enniskillen and specialised in baking and pastry arts management in DIT Kevin Street. His father John is involved in the food industry, running an event management company which sets up cookery demonstrations and food festivals.

Media work 
Adrian is a resident chef on the Six o' Clock show on TV3/Virgin Media 1 which is hosted by Martin King and Lucy Kennedy. He has contributed recipes to RTÉ Guide, Woman's Way magazine, The Anglo-Celt, and Easy Food Magazine. He has also featured in other TV programmes such as Swipe TV, a kids show on RTÉ, Irish TV and RTÉ Today. He has his own recipes on Food Bites on RTÉ Player labelled Fakeaway by Chef Adrian.  and has also starred in Chef Adrian Eats Ireland and Wild Cooks.

In 2017 he published his first cookbook Fakeaway : Fast Food, Made Healthy based on his series with RTÉ.

In 2019 Adrian published his second cookery book Create Beautiful Food at Home.

With the success of this Adrian has gone on to appear and cook live at food festivals across the UK and Ireland including Taste of London, Taste of Dublin and Bloom.

Bibliography 

2017: Fakeaway: Fast Food Made Healthy 
2019: Create Beautiful Food at Home

References

External links 
 http://chefadrian.ie/
 http://www.rte.ie/player/ie/show/chef-adrian-eats-ireland-30004260/10629760/
 http://www.irishmirror.ie/whats-on/food-drink-news/cavan-super-chef-adrian-martin-8898113

Living people
RTÉ television presenters
Irish chefs
Irish television chefs
People from County Cavan
Irish television personalities
Radio personalities from the Republic of Ireland
1991 births